David Barry Cohen (born September 2, 1947) is an American politician who served as a Massachusetts state Representative for the 11th Middlesex district and as the mayor of Newton, Massachusetts.

Cohen was a member of the Newton Board of Aldermen from 1972–1979 and a state representative from 1979–1998. In 1997, Cohen defeated incumbent Mayor Thomas Concannon Jr. to win his first of three terms as mayor.

Based on statistics reported to the Federal Bureau of Investigation, Newton under Mayor Cohen's leadership was the nation's safest city during 2003, 2004 and 2005, and the fourth-safest city in the nation in 2006. The designation is based on crime statistics in six categories: murder, rape, robbery, aggravated assault, burglary, and auto theft. Cohen did not run for re-election in 2009.

Later career
Cohen decided not to run for another term in 2009 and left office on Jan. 1, 2010, replaced by political newcomer Setti Warren, who won a close race against State Representative Ruth Balser.

Cohen's final term ended with controversy over the city's new Newton North High School. With a price tag of nearly $200 million, the school is the most expensive in Massachusetts.  He said he chose not to run for a fourth term because he did not want to harm efforts to override Proposition 2½.

See also
 1979–1980 Massachusetts legislature
 1981–1982 Massachusetts legislature
 1983–1984 Massachusetts legislature
 1985–1986 Massachusetts legislature
 1987–1988 Massachusetts legislature
 1989–1990 Massachusetts legislature
 1991–1992 Massachusetts legislature
 1993–1994 Massachusetts legislature
 1995–1996 Massachusetts legislature

References

External links
 

Living people
1947 births
Mayors of Newton, Massachusetts
Harvard College alumni
Boston University School of Law alumni
Politicians from Boston
Massachusetts Democrats